Richmond Township, Ohio may refer to:

Richmond Township, Ashtabula County, Ohio
Richmond Township, Huron County, Ohio

Ohio township disambiguation pages